Brede Skorve (born 16 August 1973) is a retired Norwegian football defender.

He came up in the club Sogndal IL and represented Norway numerous times from u-16 through u-20 level, including as a squad member at the 1993 FIFA World Youth Championship. He was drafted into the first-team squad in 1992, and got 8 Eliteserien matches in 1992 and 1994.

After the 1996 season he started studying and played briefly for Manglerud Star before joining IL Nest-Sotra in 1998. He retired ahead of the 2000 season, but in 2001 he made an amateur comeback with IL Frøya, staying a couple of seasons there.

References

1973 births
Living people
People from Sogndal
Norwegian footballers
Sogndal Fotball players
Manglerud Star Toppfotball players
Nest-Sotra Fotball players
Eliteserien players
Norwegian First Division players
Association football defenders
Norway youth international footballers
Sportspeople from Vestland